Callionymus superbus, the proud dragonet or superb dragonet, is a species of dragonet native to the western Pacific Ocean where it occurs down to depths of .  This species grows to a length of  TL.

References

External links
 

S
Fish described in 1983